In the morning of 10 July 2003, a Kowloon Motor Bus (KMB) double-decker bus plunged off a bridge near the Ting Kau section of the Tuen Mun Road in Tsuen Wan, New Territories. The crash killed 21 people and injured 20.

The incident was Hong Kong's deadliest road traffic accident.

Incident

Crash
On 10 July 2003, between 6:15 to 6:30 HKT, a Neoplan Centroliner bus was running on route 265M of Kowloon Motor Bus (KMB). The bus departed from Lai Yiu Estate, Kwai Chung, Kwai Tsing, and was heading towards Tin Heng Estate, Tin Shui Wai, Yuen Long. A lorry running in the middle lane lost control as the bus approached the junction with Tsing Long Highway. The two vehicles collided, knocking the bus towards the side of the viaduct. The bus driver and 18 passengers were killed in the crash.

Immediate aftermath
Rescue operations were described as being the most challenging encountered by the fire services since the fire at Garley Building. This was due to the constraints at the site (a rural village sited on a steep hillside with no direct road access, only accessible on foot from Castle Peak Road), and the sheer volume of severely wounded casualties. 2 more passengers died after being transferred to a hospital, bringing the death toll to 21. The incident left 20 injured.

The bus was later lifted back onto Tuen Mun Road and transported to the vehicle compound at Siu Ho Wan. It was however written off.

Responses
After the incident, then-Chief Executive Tung Chee Hwa visited the crash scene and pledged that the government would do all that it could to aid the survivors, to investigate the accident and prevent similar accidents from ever happening again.

The lorry driver was sentenced to 18 months in jail after being found guilty of causing death by dangerous driving. At the time, it was the most serious road accident in Hong Kong history. He later appealed the rulings, which were subsequently overturned. Tests have shown that the vehicle he was driving was defective (tending to veer to the side when braking), and he was then found guilty of a lesser charge, careless driving, and his sentence was shortened to five months and a two-year driving ban.

As the accident involved several teachers from Tin Shui Wai,，the Hong Kong Professional Teachers' Union started a charity movement on the following day of the accident, which ended on September 30, 2007, and raised over 1.1 million HKD.

See also
 Bus services in Hong Kong
 Transport in Hong Kong
 2008 Sai Kung bus crash
 2018 Hong Kong bus accident

References

External links

2003 disasters in China
Hong Kong bus accident
Bus incidents in Hong Kong
July 2003 events in China
Kowloon Motor Bus
New Territories